The discography of Japanese singer Takahiro Nishijima, also known as Nissy, consists of two studio albums, two video albums, 14 singles and 19 music videos.

Albums

Studio albums

Compilation albums

Live albums

Singles

Promotional singles

Other charted songs

Videography

Video albums

Music videos

See also 
AAA discography

References
Notes

Sources

External links
Official website

Discographies of Japanese artists
Pop music discographies